Aboubakary Kanté (born 11 August 1994) is a Gambian professional footballer who plays as a forward for Spanish club SD Huesca. Born in France, he represents the Gambia national team.

Club career
Aboubakar began playing football at the age of 6, and played for various clubs in Paris. He joined Paris FC in 2013. He joined Béziers in 2017 after a couple of seasons in the lower divisions of France, and helped them get promoted into the Ligue 2.

Kanté made his professional debut in a 2–0 Ligue 2 win over AS Nancy on 27 July 2018. On 5 June 2019, Kanté joined Belgian club Cercle Brugge on a three-year contract. However, in the beginning of September 2019, after having only played about 65 minutes in three games, he was loaned out to Le Mans FC, according to him because he didn't felt like the club trusted him.

On 23 August 2020, Kanté agreed to a three-year contract with Spanish Segunda División side CF Fuenlabrada. On 14 July 2022, after Fuenlas relegation, he moved to fellow second division side SD Huesca on a two-year deal.

International career
Kanté was born in France and is of Gambian descent. He debuted for the Gambia in a 1–0 friendly win over Togo on 8 June 2021.

Career statistics

References

External links
 LFP Profile
 
 ASB Profile

1994 births
Living people
Sportspeople from Pontoise
People with acquired Gambian citizenship
Association football forwards
Gambian footballers
The Gambia international footballers
French footballers
French sportspeople of Gambian descent
Gambian expatriate footballers
French expatriate footballers
AS Béziers (2007) players
CA Bastia players
Paris FC players
Cercle Brugge K.S.V. players
Le Mans FC players
CF Fuenlabrada footballers
SD Huesca footballers
Ligue 2 players
Championnat National players
Championnat National 3 players
Belgian Pro League players
Segunda División players
Gambian expatriate sportspeople in Spain
French expatriate sportspeople in Belgium
French expatriate sportspeople in Spain
Expatriate footballers in Belgium
Expatriate footballers in Spain
Footballers from Val-d'Oise
Black French sportspeople